Pauncefoot may refer to:

 Compton Pauncefoot, a village and civil parish in Somerset, England
 John Pauncefoot (1368-c.1445), member of Parliament for Gloucestershire